Márcio Simão de Souza (born 24 January 1975 in Santo André, São Paulo) is a retired Brazilian hurdler who specialised in the 110 metres hurdles. Early in his career he competed as a decathlete.

He finished fifth at the 2003 World Championships in Paris and won a bronze medal at the 2003 Pan American Games in Santo Domingo.

His personal best time is 13.38 seconds, achieved in June 1999 in Rio de Janeiro.

Competition record

References

sports-reference

1975 births
Living people
Brazilian male hurdlers
Athletes (track and field) at the 2000 Summer Olympics
Athletes (track and field) at the 2004 Summer Olympics
Pan American Games athletes for Brazil
Athletes (track and field) at the 1999 Pan American Games
Athletes (track and field) at the 2003 Pan American Games
Olympic athletes of Brazil
Pan American Games medalists in athletics (track and field)
Pan American Games bronze medalists for Brazil
Medalists at the 2003 Pan American Games
Athletes from São Paulo
20th-century Brazilian people
21st-century Brazilian people